Cork is a 2022 Spanish rural drama film directed by Mikel Gurrea which stars Vicky Luengo and Pol López alongside Ilyass El Ouahdani. It is shot in Catalan.

Plot 
Set in rural Catalonia, the plot follows a couple (Elena and Iván) who moves from the city to the countryside to run an inherited cork plantation, involving as outsiders in the escalating tension between local and immigrant cork workers.

Cast 
 Vicky Luengo as Elena
  as Iván
 Ilyass El Ouahdani as Karim

Production 
Gurrea's debut feature, the project was developed at the San Sebastián's Ikusmira Berriak 2016 Residency, Sources2 and the Sam Spiegel Film Lab. The screenplay was penned by Gurrea alongside Francisco Kosterlitz.

Laia Costa was originally a cast choice for one of the leads, but eventually Vicky Luengo was cast as the protagonist. The film was produced by Lastor Media alongside Malmo Pictures and Irusoin, with the participation of TV3, EiTB, and funding from ICAA, and support from Creative Europe's MEDIA. It was shot in Catalan in locations of the province of Girona, including the Albera Massif (Alt Empordà), with, in addition to the three leads, a cast consisting of non-professional actors, primarily cork workers. Shooting started on 19 July 2021.

Release 
The film was selected for screening at the 70th San Sebastián International Film Festival's main competition, where it was presented on 19 September 2022. Distributed by A Contracorriente Films, it was theatrically released on 2 December 2022.

Reception 
Jonathan Holland of ScreenDaily wrote that the film "tells its tale unfussily and efficiently, with few stylistic flourishes".

Accolades 

|-
| rowspan = "4" align = "center" | 2022 || rowspan = "3" | 70th San Sebastián International Film Festival || colspan = "2" | Irizar Basque Film Award ||  || rowspan = "3" | 
|-
| colspan = "2" | Fipresci Award ||  
|-
| colspan = "2" | Euskal Gidoigileen Elkartea Award || 
|-
| 18th Zurich Film Festival
| colspan="2"|Best International Feature Film
| 
| 
|-
| rowspan = "12" align = "center" | 2023 || rowspan = "10" | 15th Gaudí Awards || colspan = "2" | Best Film ||  || rowspan = "10" | 
|-
| Best New Director || Mikel Gurrea || 
|-
| Best Actress || Vicky Luengo ||  
|-
| Best Actor || Pol López ||  
|-
| Best Original Screenplay || Mikel Gurrea, Francisco Kosterlitz ||  
|-
| Best Production Supervision || Mayca Sanz || 
|-
| Best Art Direction || Isona Rigau Heras || 
|-
| Best Editing || Ariadna Ribas || 
|-
| Best Original Score || Clara Aguilar || 
|-
| Best Sound || Leo Dolgan, Xanti Salvador || 
|-
| rowspan = "2" | 37th Goya Awards || Best New Director || Mikel Gurrea ||  || rowspan = "2" | 
|-
| Best Actress || Vicky Luengo || 
|}

See also 
 List of Spanish films of 2022

References 

2020s Catalan-language films
Spanish drama films
Films shot in the province of Girona
Films set in Catalonia
Films about internal migration
Films about immigration to Spain
2022 drama films
2022 films
2020s Spanish films
2022 directorial debut films